Hargaon Assembly constituency is  one of the 403 constituencies of the Uttar Pradesh Legislative Assembly,  India. It is a part of the Sitapur district and one  of the five assembly constituencies in the Dhaurahra Lok Sabha constituency. First election in this assembly constituency was held in 1967 after the "DPACO (1967)" (delimitation order) was passed in 1967. After the "Delimitation of Parliamentary and Assembly Constituencies Order" was passed in 2008, the constituency was assigned identification number 147.

Wards  / Areas
Extent of Hargaon Assembly constituency is PCs Narsohi, Gujra, Badagaon, Umari, Dena of Sitapur (Sadar) KC, PCs Musepur Mutawalli, Sonari, Rakhaona, Badewara of Khairabad KC, KC Hargaon & Hargaon NP of Sitapur Tehsil (Sadar); KC Katesar, PCs Samaudideeh, Bhadfar, Marsanda, Pipria, Tejwapur, Belwa Gohniya, Anba, Kusepa, Chandesua, Makhu Behar, Garasa, Ratauli, Ram Rurha, Chenia, Belwa Dingura, Foolpur Guria, Mugalpur & Bareti of Marsanda KC of Laharpur Tehsil.

Members of the Legislative Assembly

Election results

2022

2012
16th Vidhan Sabha: 2012 General  Elections

See also

Dhaurahra Lok Sabha constituency
Sitapur district
Sixteenth Legislative Assembly of Uttar Pradesh
Uttar Pradesh Legislative Assembly
Vidhan Bhawan

References

External links
 

Assembly constituencies of Uttar Pradesh
Politics of Sitapur district